Jahun is a Local Government Area of Jigawa State, Nigeria. Its headquarters are in the town of Jahun.

It has an area of 1,172 km and a population of 229,094 at the 2006 census.

The postal code of the area is 720.

References

Local Government Areas in Jigawa State